Alexei Kondratyevich Savrasov (May 24, 1830 – September 26, 1897) was a Russian landscape painter and creator of the lyrical landscape style.

Biography
Savrasov was born into the family of a merchant. He began to draw early and in 1838 he enrolled as a student of professor Karl Rabus at the Moscow School of Painting, Sculpture and Architecture (MSPSA). He graduated in 1850 and immediately began to specialize in landscape painting.

In 1852, he traveled to Ukraine. Then, in 1854 by the invitation of the Grand Duchess Maria Nikolayevna, President of the Imperial Academy of Arts, he moved to the neighborhood of St. Petersburg. In 1857, Savrasov became a teacher at the MSPSA. His best students, Isaac Levitan and Konstantin Korovin, remembered their teacher with admiration and gratitude.

In 1857, he married Sophia Karlovna Hertz, sister of the art historian Karl Hertz (1820-1883). In their home they entertained artistic people and collectors including Pavel Tretyakov. Savrasov became especially close with Vasily Perov. Perov helped him paint the figures of the boat trackers in Savrasov's Volga near Yuryevets, Savrasov painted landscapes for Perov's Bird catcher and Hunters on Bivouac.

In the 1860s, he traveled to England to see the International Exhibition, and to Switzerland. In one of his letters he wrote that no academies in the world could so advance an artist as the present world exhibition. The painters who influenced him most were British painter John Constable and Swiss painter Alexandre Calame.

The Rooks Have Come Back (1871) is considered by many critics to be the high point in Savrasov’s artistic career. Using a common, even trivial, episode of birds returning home, and an extremely simple landscape, Savrasov emotionally showed the transition of nature from winter to spring. It was a new type of lyrical landscape painting, called later by critics the mood landscape. The painting brought him fame. In 1870, he became a member of the Peredvizhniki group, breaking with government-sponsored academic art.

In the late 1870s, he gradually became an alcoholic. The process may have begun with the death of his daughter in 1871, which led to a crisis in his art and, possibly, dissatisfaction with his artistic career. In 1882, he was dismissed from his position at the MSPSA. All attempts of his relatives and friends to help him were in vain.

His work suffered dramatically and the last years of his life were spent in poverty. He was usually drunk and often dressed in rags. Finally, he found himself wandering from shelter to shelter. Only the doorkeeper of the MSPSA and Pavel Tretyakov, founder of the Tretyakov Gallery, were present at his funeral in 1897.

Selected works

See also
 List of Russian artists

References

Further reading
Faina Sergeyevna Maltseva, Alexei Kondratyevich Savrasov, Leningrad, 1989,

External links

 Savrasov's works at Olga's Gallery.
 Savrasov's biography.

1830 births
1897 deaths
Artists from Moscow
People from Moskovsky Uyezd
Russian male painters
Russian realist painters
Russian Impressionist painters
Russian landscape painters
Peredvizhniki
19th-century painters from the Russian Empire
19th-century male artists from the Russian Empire
Burials at Vagankovo Cemetery
Moscow School of Painting, Sculpture and Architecture alumni
Academic staff of the Moscow School of Painting, Sculpture and Architecture